Martin Joseph Berry (born 13 July 1966) is a former New Zealand rugby union player. Following a successful spell playing with Glasgow Academicals in Scotland, he was a member of the New Zealand national side, the All Blacks, in 1986 and 1993, playing 10 matches, including a single test match appearance as a substitute. He is the father of Rocco Berry, a rugby league player for the New Zealand Warriors.

References

1966 births
Living people
New Zealand rugby union players
New Zealand international rugby union players
Wellington rugby union players
Manawatu rugby union players
New Zealand expatriate rugby union players
Expatriate rugby union players in Italy
New Zealand expatriate sportspeople in Italy
Petrarca Rugby players
Wairarapa Bush rugby union players
People educated at Chanel College, Masterton
Rugby union players from Wellington City